Ilie Matei (born 11 July 1960) is a retired light-heavyweight Greco-Roman wrestler from Romania. He won silver medals at the 1984 Summer Olympics and 1985 European Championships, placing third in 1983 and 1986.

References

External links
 

1960 births
Living people
Olympic wrestlers of Romania
Wrestlers at the 1984 Summer Olympics
Romanian male sport wrestlers
Olympic silver medalists for Romania
Olympic medalists in wrestling
Medalists at the 1984 Summer Olympics
Universiade medalists in wrestling
Universiade gold medalists for Romania
European Wrestling Championships medalists
Medalists at the 1981 Summer Universiade
20th-century Romanian people